Bahij is an Arabic name which is used as a masculine given name and a surname. People with the name include:

Given name
 Bahij al-Khatib (1895–1981), Syrian politician
 Bahij Hojeij (born 1948), Lebanese film director and screenwriter
 Bahij Tabbara (born 1929), Lebanese lawyer and politician

Middle name
 Walid Bahij Ismail (born 1984), Lebanese football player

Surname
 Abdul Hamid Bahij (born 1979), Afghan medical doctor

Arabic masculine given names
Arabic-language surnames